The Campos de Manicoré Environmental Protection Area is an environmental protection area (APA) in the state of Amazonas, Brazil.

Location

The Campos de Manicoré Environmental Protection Area (APA) is in the municipality of Manicoré, Amazonas.
It is some distance to the north of the stretch of the Trans-Amazonian Highway (BR-230) between Humaitá and Apuí in the region between the Madeira River and the Aripuanã River.
The Manicoré River defines the east boundary of the APA.

History

The Campos de Manicoré Environmental Protection Area was created by presidential decree on 11 April 2016.
The purpose was to protect biological diversity and control the process of occupying the region, in particular along the road being built between Santo Antônio de Matupi on BR-230 and the seat of the municipality of Manicoré on the Madeira River.
Santo Antônio do Matupí is a major centre of logging in the region.

The APA was one of five conservation units created in last week before the provisional removal of president Dilma Rousseff, totalling , all in the south of Amazonas state.

Her administration had also reduced the area of seven protected areas in the Amazon to allow for construction of dams on the Tapajós.

Notes

Sources

2016 establishments in Brazil
Environmental protection areas of Brazil
Protected areas of Amazonas (Brazilian state)